The 2004 Ukrainian Football Amateur League season. 

This season competition consisted of three stages. All of the stages were organized in regional principal and was played in two rounds where each team could play another at its home ground except the last one. The third stage was played in the single round to identify the finalists and the third place contenders. There were six groups in the first stage and four – in the second. The third part, which was the final consisted of two groups. The winners of groups advance to the finals and runners-up match up in the game for the third place.

Teams

Returning
 Sokil Berezhany
 Kremin Kremenchuk

Debut
List of teams that are debuting this season in the league.

Rozdillia Novyi Rozdil, Karpaty Yaremche, ODEK Orzhiv, Torpedo Kostopil, Iskra Teofopil, FC Korosten, Interahrosystema Mena, Yednist Plysky, Lokomotyv Kupyansk, Khimik Krasnoperekopsk, HU ZIDMU-Spartak Zaporizhzhia, FC Slovyansk, Olimpik Donetsk, Metalurh Komsomolske

Withdrawn
List of clubs that took part in last year competition, but chose not to participate in 2004 season:

 Teplovyk Ivano-Frankivsk
 Prylad-LDTU Lutsk
 Fakel Varva
 Ikar Kirovohrad
 Shakhtar Sverdlovsk

 FC Luzhany
 KLO-CSKA Bucha
 DPA-TETs Cherkasy
 Kolos Stepove
 FC Torez

 Merkuriy-ChTEI Chernivtsi
 Dnipro Kyiv
 Naftovyk-2 Okhtyrka
 ZAlK Zaporizhia

Location map

First stage

Group A

Group B

Group C

Group D

Group E

Group F

Second stage

Group 1

Group 2

Group 3

Third stage

Group A

Group B

Final

The game took place in  Slovyansk, Donetsk Oblast. October 1, 2006.

Slovyansk - KZEZO Kakhovka 1:2 (1:1)

Match for the 3rd place Yednist Plysky - Yevropa Pryluky 3:2

Ukrainian Football Amateur League seasons
Amateur
Amateur